Conrad of Lichtenberg (1240 – 1 August 1299) was a bishop of Strasbourg in the 13th century.

Lichtenberg was born to a wealthy family and entered the clergy at the age of 13. He was elected Bishop of Strasbourg in 1273. He died in combat while supporting his brother-in-law Egino against the city of Freiburg.

Credit is given to Lichtenberg for the construction of the Western facade of Notre-Dame de Strasbourg, realized by German architect Erwin von Steinbach (1244–1318). Lichtenberg is buried there in Chapel Saint Jean.

The Château de Lichtenberg in Alsace, France remains today.

1240 births
1299 deaths
Bishops of Strasbourg